USS Oxford is a name used more than once by the U.S. Navy:

 , an attack transport commissioned 11 September 1944.
 , laid down 23 June 1945.

United States Navy ship names